Science et Vie TV is a French thematic television channel dedicated to the scientific world.

History
Science et Vie TV was launched on 30 March 2015 at 8:45 pm after an association between Mondadori France and AB Groupe, enabling the scientific journal Science & Vie to decline on television to replace the pre-existing Encyclo.

In April 2016, Science et Vie TV became included in the basic offer of Canalsat, previously the channel was on its Crescendo option.

Programming
The channel evokes different aspects of science: technology, health, nature and environment, society and space.

 Le mag de la science: a weekly magazine presented by Jérôme Bonaldi dedicated to the man of the future.
 Megastructure: weekly documentary.

References

External links
 

Mediawan Thematics
Television stations in France
Television channels and stations established in 2015
French-language television stations
2015 establishments in France
Mass media in Paris